Cordier is a surname. Notable people with the surname include:

 Andrew W. Cordier (1901–1975), American administrator
 Balthasar Cordier (1592–1650), Belgian theologian
 Baude Cordier (c. 1380–before 1440), French composer
 Charles Henri Joseph Cordier (1827–1905), French sculptor
 David Cordier (born 1959), English countertenor
 Douglas Cordier (born 1953), American politician
 Henri Cordier (1849–1925), French historian, author of comments on Travels of Marco Polo
 Henri Cordier (mountaineer) (1856–1877), French mountaineer
 John Cordier (1942–2002), Belgian businessman
 Joseph Cordier (1773–?), Acting Governor General of Pondicherry
 Louis Cordier (1777–1861), French geologist and mineralogist
 Mathurin Cordier (1480–1564) (pen name Corderius), French pedagogue
 Michaël Cordier (born 1984), Belgian footballer 
 Noëlle Cordier (born 1944), French singer
 Patrick Cordier (alpinist)
 Patrick Cordier (mineralogist)
 Pierre Cordier (born 1933), Belgian artist

French-language surnames
Occupational surnames